OII may refer to:

Organisations
 OII, market exchange symbol for Oceaneering International
 Office of Innovation and Improvement, an office of the United States Department of Education
 Organisation Intersex International, a global advocacy and support group for people with intersex traits
 Oxford Internet Institute, a multi-disciplinary department, part of the University of Oxford, England

See also
 Organisation Intersex International Australia
 OII Europe
 Oii-Chinese, the Chinese language affiliate of Organisation Intersex International